Timoner is a surname found in Spanish-heritage populations and among Ashkenazi Jews (region of Tymanivka, Ukraine). 

 Chana Timoner (born 1951), Jewish U.S. Army chaplain 
 Gerard Timoner (born 1958), Filipino priest, head of the Dominicans
 Guillermo Timoner (born 1926), Spanish cyclist
 Ondi Timoner (born 1972), U.S. film director